Louis Edward O'Dea (died 19 February 1955) was an Irish politician and solicitor. He was first elected to Dáil Éireann as a Sinn Féin Teachta Dála (TD) for the Galway constituency at the 1923 general election.  He did not take his seat in the Dáil due to Sinn Féin's abstentionist policy. He did not contest June 1927 general election. He was an unsuccessful candidate for the Galway West constituency at the 1938 general election. In 1944 as a member of Fianna Fáil, he was elected to the 5th Seanad on the Cultural and Educational Panel.

References

Year of birth missing
1955 deaths
Fianna Fáil senators
Members of the 4th Dáil
Members of the 5th Seanad
Politicians from County Galway
Irish solicitors
Early Sinn Féin TDs